A special election was held in  on August 6, 1801, to fill a vacancy created when David Stone (F) resigned upon being elected to the Senate before the 7th Congress began.

Election results

Johnson took his seat on December 7, 1801, at the start of the 7th Congress.  He subsequently died on July 23, 1802, creating a second vacancy which was filled in another special election.

See also
List of special elections to the United States House of Representatives

References

North Carolina 1801 08
North Carolina 1801 08
1801 08
North Carolina 08
United States House of Representatives 08
United States House of Representatives 1801 08